The Daugavpils–Kurcums Railway is a  long,  gauge railway built in the 19th century to connect Daugavpils and Vilnius as part of the Warsaw – Saint Petersburg Railway.

References 

Railway lines in Latvia
Transport in Daugavpils
Railway lines opened in 1860
19th-century establishments in Latvia
5 ft gauge railways in Latvia
1860 establishments in the Russian Empire